Edward Lloyd may refer to:

Politicians
Edward Lloyd (MP for Montgomery), Welsh lawyer and politician
Edward Lloyd (16th-century MP) (died 1547) for Buckingham
Edward Lloyd, 1st Baron Mostyn (1768–1854), British politician
Edward Lloyd (Colonial Governor of Maryland) (1670–1718), Governor of the Maryland Colony, 1709–1714
Edward Lloyd (Continental Congress) (1744–1796), his grandson, Maryland delegate to the Continental Congress
Edward Lloyd (Governor of Maryland) (1779–1834), his son, U.S. Congressman and Senator, and Governor of Maryland, 1809–1811
Edward Lloyd (1798–1861), his son, President of the Maryland State Senate, 1852–53
Edward Lloyd (1825–1907), his son, President of the Maryland State Senate 1878 and 1892
Edward Henry Lloyd (1825–1889), Australian politician from New South Wales

Others
 Edward Lhuyd (1660–1709), Welsh naturalist, botanist, linguist, geographer and antiquary
Edward Floyd or Lloyd (died 1648), impeached English man
Edward Lloyd (c. 1648–1713), ran Lloyd's Coffee House in London, a meeting place for shipowners that spawned Lloyd's of London, Lloyd's Register, and Lloyd's List
Sir Edward Pryce Lloyd, 1st Baronet (c. 1710–1795), whose son was created Baron Mostyn in 1831
Edward Lloyd (publisher) (1815–1890), British owner of the Daily Chronicle and Lloyd's Weekly Newspaper
Edward Lloyd (tenor) (1845–1927), British oratorio singer
Edward Lloyd (cricketer) (1845–1928), English schoolmaster and cricketer

See also
John Edward Lloyd (1861–1947), Welsh historian
Edward Lloyd Jones (1874–1934), Australian cattle breeder and chairman of David Jones department store